Mena Alexandra Suvari (born February 13, 1979) is an American actress, producer, fashion designer and model. After beginning her career as a model and guest-starring on several television shows, she made her film debut in the 1997 drama Nowhere.

Suvari rose to international prominence with her appearances in the critically acclaimed comedy-drama American Beauty (1999), for which she received a BAFTA nomination for Best Supporting Actress, and in three of the American Pie films (1999–2001, 2012). Her other notable film credits include Kiss the Girls (1997), Slums of Beverly Hills (1998), The Rage: Carrie 2 (1999), Loser (2000), Sugar & Spice, The Musketeer (both 2001), Sonny (2002), Spun (2003), Trauma (2004), Beauty Shop, Domino, Rumor Has It (all 2005), Factory Girl (2006), Brooklyn Rules, Stuck (both 2007), Day of the Dead (2008), and You May Not Kiss the Bride (2010).

Suvari played recurring roles on the fourth season of the HBO drama series Six Feet Under (2004), for which she earned a Screen Actors Guild nomination, and on the second season of Chicago Fire (2013). She also portrayed Elizabeth Short in the anthology series American Horror Story: Murder House (2011), and reprised the part in American Horror Story: Apocalypse (2018). Her other television credits include the supernatural horror series South of Hell (2015) and the short-lived Paramount sitcom American Woman (2018).
 
Suvari has been a model for Lancôme cosmetics and print ads for Lancôme Paris Adaptîve, as well as a long-time supporter and activist for the Starlight Children's Foundation and the African Medical and Research Foundation. She is married and has one child.

Early life
Suvari was born in Newport, Rhode Island on February 13, 1979, the daughter of nurse Candice (née Chambers) and psychiatrist Ando Ivar Süvari. Her mother is of Greek descent, while her father was an Estonian from Pärnu. She has five brothers Agu, Madis, Ando Junior, Sulev and Yuri (Jüri) and sister Mari-Ann. Suvari began modeling with Millie Lewis Models and Talent as a preteen and soon after appeared in a Rice-A-Roni commercial. The family later relocated to Charleston, South Carolina, where her brothers attended The Citadel. When Suvari was twelve, she was raped by her 16-year-old boyfriend. Suvari was considering becoming an archaeologist, astronaut, or doctor when a modeling agency stopped by her all-girls school, Ashley Hall, to offer classes. By the time she started acting, she had been modeling for the New York-based Wilhelmina agency for five years. Suvari relocated to California and attended Providence High School in Burbank, graduating in 1997.

Career

1995–1998: Early acting credits
Suvari began acting with guest appearances in television series such as Boy Meets World and ER at the ages of 15 and 16, respectively. She also appeared in a number of episodes of the show High Incident, and played a girl infected with HIV in a one-episode appearance in Chicago Hope. She made the transition to film with the role of Zoe in the 1997 independent coming-of-age drama Nowhere, directed by Gregg Araki and co-starring James Duval, Rachel True, Heather Graham, and Ryan Phillippe. Also in 1997, she had a supporting part in the independent film Snide and Prejudice, which premiered at the Cannes Film Festival, and had a brief part in the thriller Kiss the Girls, opposite Morgan Freeman and Ashley Judd. She next appeared in the independent dramedy Slums of Beverly Hills, as a teenaged neighbor of a Jewish girl struggling to grow up in the late 1970s. The film received a limited release, and has developed a cult following. Suvari met Natasha Lyonne on the set of Slums, with whom she would later appear in the American Pie films. She subsequently played a teenager who commits suicide in the horror sequel The Rage: Carrie 2 (1999), and appeared as the daughter of an NTSB investigator in the disaster thriller NBC miniseries Atomic Train (1999), although both productions were panned by critics.

1999–2001: Breakthrough
Her breakthrough came in 1999, with significant roles in two highly successful films —the teen sex comedy American Pie and the drama American Beauty. In American Pie, she starred with Jason Biggs, Shannon Elizabeth, Chris Klein, and Natasha Lyonne, portraying a virgin and innocent choir girl named Heather. While critical response was mixed, the film was a commercial success, grossing $235 million worldwide.

In American Beauty, directed by Sam Mendes and co-starring Kevin Spacey, Annette Bening, Wes Bentley and Thora Birch, Suvari took on the role of Angela Hayes, a vain teenage girl who becomes the object of infatuation of a man experiencing a midlife crisis. The New York Times described her character as "stimulus enough for [Spacey's character] to wake up out of a marriage-long coma and start considering life's livelier possibilities". The film received widespread critical acclaim, and was the recipient of the Academy Award for Best Picture. American Beauty made $356 million globally and earned Suvari a BAFTA Award nomination for Best Supporting Actress. Suvari and her American Beauty co-stars Wes Bentley and Thora Birch presented the 2000 Oscar for Best Documentary short subject.

Suvari subsequently reunited with Jason Biggs in the romantic comedy Loser (2000), playing the love interest of a small-town, intelligent man. A lukewarm critical and commercial reception greeted the film, but The New York Times  found Suvari to be "well matched with the handsome, unassuming Mr. Biggs. They're attractive without being offensively cute, and their characters manage to be genuinely nice without seeming bland or phony". She and Biggs also appeared in the music video for the song "Teenage Dirtbag" by American rock band Wheatus. The video was heavily based on their roles in Loser. She then starred in the satirical comedy American Virgin, as the daughter of an adult film director who agrees to lose her virginity onscreen to spite her father. The original working title of the film was Live Virgin, but was changed to capitalize on Suvari's previous successes in American Pie and American Beauty.

Suvari continued to act steadily, taking on roles in three 2001 feature films —The Musketeer, American Pie 2 and Sugar & Spice. In the adventure action film The Musketeer, she played a chambermaid and the love interest of the titular character, while American Pie 2 saw her reprise her role from the first film. Like the original, the sequel was a commercial success, grossing $285 million globally. In the teen crime comedy Sugar & Spice, Suvari portrayed one member of a group of cheerleaders who conspire and commit armed robbery. Although the film received negative reviews and only made $16.9 million worldwide, it has since become a cult favorite on home video.

2002–2009: Independent films
In Spun (2002), an independent dramedy opposite Brittany Murphy and John Leguizamo about drug abuse, Suvari played an addict and the girlfriend of a drug dealer (Leguizamo). She subsequently appeared as a prostitute working in a New Orleans brothel in the small-scale drama Sonny (2002), the directorial debut of Nicolas Cage co-starring James Franco and Brenda Blethyn, and also starred opposite Colin Firth in the psychological thriller Trauma (2004), as the neighbour of a man who awakens from a coma. Trauma premiered on the film festival circuit, receiving mediocre reviews from critics, who compared it unfavorably to Jacob's Ladder and Memento. In the fourth season of the acclaimed HBO serial Six Feet Under, which aired in 2004, Suvari obtained the recurring role of a lesbian performance poet and artist named Edie. She and the cast eventually received a Screen Actors Guild Award nomination for Outstanding Performance by an Ensemble in a Drama Series. She played supporting parts in five feature films the following year—Standing Still, Edmond, Rumor Has It, Domino, and Beauty Shop.

In 2006, Suvari voiced the character of Aerith Gainsborough for the Square Enix–Disney video game Kingdom Hearts II and the English-language version of Square Enix's film Final Fantasy VII Advent Children, which was released straight-to-DVD in North America and became one of the best-selling animated movies in the country. Opposite Katherine Heigl, Suvari starred in the independent comedy Caffeine (2006), playing the staff of a London coffeehouse, and in the biographical drama Factory Girl (2006), she played a friend and roommate of 1960s underground film star and socialite Edie Sedgwick (played by Sienna Miller). While Caffeine went unnoticed, Factory Girl received a limited theatrical release amid a negative critical response.

In the crime drama Brooklyn Rules (2007), directed by Michael Corrente and co-starring Freddie Prinze Jr., Alec Baldwin and Scott Caan, Suvari portrayed a society girl and the girlfriend of a man involved with the Brooklyn mafia in the 1980s. The film was released for selected theaters and received mixed reviews, but Variety remarked that Suvari, "who might have played [her part] as a cliché, gives a real performance". Her next film was the psychological thriller Stuck, where she took on the role of a woman who commits a hit-and-run and leaves the victim clinging to his life in the windshield of her car. Inspired by the true story of the murder of Gregory Glenn Biggs, the film premiered at the Cannes Film Market, and while Stuck found a limited theatrical release, it was favorably received by critics and audiences. Austin Chronicle found the film to be "buoyed by queasy, easy performances" from Suvari and Rea, who were considered "well-matched in uneasy roles" by Empire.

By the late 2000s, Suvari continued to act in smaller-scale projects, obtaining four back-to-back roles in films released throughout 2008, including one made-for-television film. Day of the Dead, a remake of George A. Romero's horror film of the same name, saw her portray what was described as a "butch military leader capable of fending off a zombie holocaust", by DVD Talk. The film received a straight-to-DVD release and was panned by critics. In The Mysteries of Pittsburgh, a film adaptation of writer Michael Chabon's novel, Suvari played a strange girl who works at a book shop and becomes romantically involved with the well-mannered, intelligent son of a Jewish gangster. The film premiered at the Sundance Film Festival and received a limited release. Website Collider felt that Suvari did a "decent job" in her "small" part, while Roger Ebert called her "pitch-perfect" in a "finally thankless role", as part of a mixed critical reception.

The Garden of Eden, the film adaptation of Ernest Hemingway's novel, featured Suvari as a sexually confused and restless woman and one half of a couple who travel across Europe amid a deteriorating marriage. She shaved her head for the part, but used three wigs for the in-between stages; on which she remarked: "It was a bit strange. It was also very liberating at the same time [...] I am grateful for the experience I am happy that I got to do it at least once in my life. It was like its own psychological experiment. It was very empowering for me to go through and a challenging to experience how people perceive you". The film premiered at the Rome Film Festival and had a limited investors' screening in the UK. Reviews were negative for the film, with the Los Angeles Times calling it a "literary B-side turned into something not awful, just forgettable". Her last 2008 film was the Lifetime production Sex and Lies in Sin City, about the events leading to the death of Las Vegas casino owner Ted Binion.

2010–present: Television roles
Suvari made one-episode appearances in Psych in 2010, and in The Cape in 2011, and also had a two-episode arc as the Black Dahlia in Murder House, the first season of the anthology horror series American Horror Story. In the independent romantic comedy You May Not Kiss the Bride (2010), opposite Dave Annable, Katharine McPhee and Rob Schneider, Suvari starred as the psychotic assistant of a pet photographer. The film debuted at the Sonoma International Film Festival and was released for selected theaters and VOD, garnering largely negative reviews. Blu-ray.com considered the film to be "a noisy, unlikable distraction" that "depends on Suvari and Schneider to carry the comedy workload, which is about as appealing as it reads". In 2011, she also starred in the made-for-television film No Surrender, as a writer having a deranged stalker, and in the B movie Restitution, opposite Tom Arnold.

Suvari returned to the American Pie franchise when she played for the third time her role of Heather in American Reunion (2012), revolving around the original protagonists as they approach middle age and prepare for a summer reunion. Reviewers found the film to be a "sweetly nostalgic comfort food" for fans of the franchise, and with a worldwide gross of $235 million, American Reunion emerged as Suvari's most-widely seen film since 2001's American Pie 2. This film also marked her only wide release in the 2010s, as all of her recent previous and subsequent film productions —The Knot (2012), Don't Blink (2014), The Opposite Sex (2014), Badge of Honor (2015), and Becks (2017) — premiered on either festival circuits or digital markets.

In the romantic comedy The Knot, Suvari starred as the soon-to-be-married daughter of a working-class couple, and in the mystery thriller Don't Blink, Suvari played one in a group of friends who visit an empty remote resort and attempt to find out what happened to the other guests. In its review for the latter film, FrightFest.co.uk remarked: "[...] Suvari is wasted and not given a whole lot of screen time considering that her character is the one we're obviously supposed to latch onto". Suvari starred opposite Geoff Stults and Kristin Chenoweth in the romantic comedy The Opposite Sex, as a young divorcee resenting men who meets a successful, driven attorney and womanizer. The small-scale thriller Badge of Honor saw her star as a detective caught up in the aftermath of a violent drug bust.

The independent romantic comedy Becks featured Suvari as the friend of a lesbian musician who moves back to St. Louis. Despite finding a limited audience, the film received positive reviews from critics. The New York Times felt that the film "exemplifies how small judgments in pace, performance and soundtrack can transcend modest trappings", while The Washington Post remarked: "[Lena] Hall and Suvari have a palpable chemistry, both musically and in their relationship".

Suvari continued to work steadily on television between films and throughout the decade; she obtained the regular role of a political consultant of a firefighter in the second season of the series Chicago Fire (2013), and took on the leading role of a demon-hunter for hire in the eight-episode supernatural series South of Hell (2015). All episodes of the show aired back-to-back and an eighth episode was made available only through iTunes. The series received generally negative reviews and brought an average of 122,000 viewers. The Hollywood Reporter, commenting on Suvari, asserted: "[W]hile the prospect of playing [her role] seems like it ought to be enticing for Suvari, her more general interpretation appears to be closer to miserable discomfort, which may be related to either those contact lenses or the strangeness" in her portrayal.

Between 2016 and 2017, Suvari made guest appearances in the television series Inside Amy Schumer, Justice League Action, and American Ninja Warrior, and starred in the made-for-television films I'll Be Home For Christmas and Psych: The Movie, where she reprised her guest-starring role from the series and basis of the film. The sitcom American Woman features Suvari as one of three women discovering their own brand of independence amid the rise of second-wave feminism in the 1970s. The series premiered on June 8, 2018, on Paramount Network. The series was canceled after one season.

Public image

Suvari is a model for Lancôme cosmetics and print ads for Lancôme Paris Adaptîve. She has also appeared in print ads for luxury accessories company Coach. She has appeared in commercials for Continental Sauces, Orange and Rice-A-Roni. Suvari has been featured in several fashion blogs and magazines such as Seventeen, Elle, Cosmopolitan (Hungary, Estonia and the US), Details, Rolling Stone, Vogue, Marie Claire, Nylon, Vanity Fair, Glamour, Tatler and Lucky. She is a frequent guest star at New York Fashion Week, among other fashion events.

People magazine published an article about her titled "All-American Girl" in 1999. She was chosen as the most "patriotic" artist of 2000 by Entertainment Weekly, making allusion to her three consecutive films with the word "American" on their titles: American Pie (1999), American Beauty (1999) and American Virgin (2000).

Philanthropy 
Suvari has worked several times with the Natural Resources Defense Council, designing with the group a scarf line called ECHO, which was unveiled at Bloomingdales in Manhattan. She remarked: "I've always been into fashion and I wanted to design something to give to charity". She has also played on the World Poker Tour in the Hollywood Home games for the Starlight Children's Foundation, and is active in female empowerment issues, being involved with several charities whose cause is breast cancer, the "End Violence Against Women" campaign, and tours high schools as a "Circle Of Friends" spokesperson, encouraging teenagers to quit smoking. Suvari is a long-time supporter and activist for the African Medical and Research Foundation, and has visited Africa to work on "small-income-generating and water-and-sanitation projects" with the organization.

Personal life
Suvari married German-born cinematographer Robert Brinkmann on March 4, 2000. Brinkmann was 17 years her senior. On April 24, 2005, she filed for legal separation, citing irreconcilable differences; the divorce was finalized in May 2005.

In 2007 Suvari began dating Italian Canadian concert promoter Simone Sestito, whom she met at the 2007 Toronto International Film Festival. Suvari and Sestito became engaged in July 2008 during a vacation to Jamaica. They were married on June 26, 2010, in a private chapel in Rome. On January 13, 2012, Suvari filed for divorce from him in Los Angeles, citing irreconcilable differences and listing November 1, 2011 as the date of separation. The divorce was finalized in October 2012.

In late 2017 Suvari became a vegan. Since then she has only used cruelty-free and environmentally friendly products, as well as sustainable clothing.

Suvari married set decorator Michael Hope in October 2018. On October 16, 2020, they announced that they were expecting their first child. In April 2021 it was announced that she had given birth to a boy named Christopher.

Filmography

Film

Television

Video games

Music videos

Awards and nominations

References

External links 

 

1979 births
Actresses from Rhode Island
Actresses from South Carolina
American child actresses
American film actresses
American people of Estonian descent
American people of Greek descent
American television actresses
American video game actresses
American voice actresses
Living people
Outstanding Performance by a Cast in a Motion Picture Screen Actors Guild Award winners
Artists from Newport, Rhode Island
20th-century American actresses
21st-century American actresses